St. Francis of Assisi Catholic College is a mixed Roman Catholic secondary school in Walsall, England.

It was previously known as St Francis of Assisi RC School, until it was renamed St Francis of Assisi Catholic Technology College in September 2003 after gaining specialist status as a Technology College. With the ending of the specialist schools programme the school adopted its present name.

The school has approximately 1,100 pupils on roll of which around 110 attend the sixth form (years 12 and 13). Admission to the school is prioritised for baptised Catholic children from Catholic primary schools in Aldridge, Brownhills, Lichfield, Shelfield, Streetly, Tamworth, and Walsall.

Charity events
The school hosts annual charity events, with the sixth form hosting a Breast Cancer Awareness Week raising funds for the charity. In December 2009 a pupil at the school organized a shoe box appeal for the Armed Forces of Great Britain. This was a success as it was the first year that the school had ever raised money or awareness for the S.O.S (Support our Soldiers) charity. The school supported the charity by creating over 100 care parcels and raised money for the soldiers at work around the world.

Motto

Notable former pupils
 Dan Martin, Irish cyclist.
 Professor Martin Levesley, Leeds University.

References

External links
 
 DCSF
 Directgov

Secondary schools in Walsall
Catholic secondary schools in the Archdiocese of Birmingham
Aldridge
Voluntary aided schools in England